Snow Angels is the ninth studio album, and second Christmas album, by Over the Rhine, released independently in  2006. The album was released by Great Speckled Dog on October 2, 2007.

Snow Angels was released ten years after the group's first Christmas disc, 1996's The Darkest Night of the Year. While Darkest Night was largely composed of interpretations of traditional Christmas songs, Snow Angels was almost entirely original material. The only non-original track in the album is a lounge-inspired take on "Jingle Bells" that debuted during the 2004 Christmas tour.

Track listing
 "All I Ever Get for Christmas Is Blue" (4:24)
 "Darlin' (Christmas is Coming)" (3:33)
 "White Horse" (4:14)
 "Little Town" (3:22)
 "New Redemption Song" (2:25)
 "Goodbye Charles" (2:17)
 "Snowed In With You" (5:07)
 "North Pole Man" (3:07)
 "Here It Is" (3:24)
 "One Olive Jingle" (3:55)
 "Snow Angel" (4:28)
 "We're Gonna Pull Through" (2:47)

Personnel
Linford Detweiler: piano, acoustic guitar, Hammond organ, accordion, bells, background vocals
Karin Bergquist: vocals
Mickey Grimm: drums and percussion
Byron House: upright bass
Brad Jones: bass, Lowrey organ, mandolin, electric guitar, acoustic guitar
Fats Kaplin: violin
David Henry: cello

Notes
 "Goodbye Charles" is a piano instrumental inspired by Vince Guaraldi's compositions from A Charlie Brown Christmas
 "Darlin' (Christmas Is Coming)" was performed live as far back as the 2001 Christmas tour as a straight mid-tempo folk/pop song.  The Snow Angels recording was drastically re-arranged into a swing-style arrangement and performed this way on the 2006 tour. 
 "White Horse" was written and first performed in 2004; a live version appears on Live From Nowhere, Volume 1.
 "All I Ever Get for Christmas Is Blue" was first performed live on the 2001 Christmas tour, and was regularly performed on each subsequent Christmas tour.
 The title "North Pole Man" was inspired by a drawing by Polly Wilson, age 7, called "North Pole Man Holding a Map Looking for a Warm Place".
 The front cover illustration is by Clinton Reno, who had worked with Over The Rhine previously in designing a tour poster commemorating their 2006 tour with Hem.

References

External links
 Snow Angels - entry on OtR's official site

Over the Rhine (band) albums
2006 Christmas albums
Christmas albums by American artists
Folk rock Christmas albums